Wylliesburg is an unincorporated community in Charlotte County, Virginia, United States. Wylliesburg has a post office with ZIP code 23976.

References

Unincorporated communities in Charlotte County, Virginia
Unincorporated communities in Virginia